The Baldwin Class 10-12-D was a class of narrow gauge  steam locomotives built by the Baldwin Locomotive Works (USA) for the British War Department Light Railways for service in France during World War I.  They were built in 1916–1917 to  gauge.

Origins of the type
The Belgians had designed  gauge 2′C n2t locomotives as early as in 1900–1901 for Chemins de fer du Calvados. The prototype was Tubize factory type 73. Weidknecht used these drawings and built similar 11-ton locomotives with subcontracted boilers, presumably built by  S.A.Energie, Marcinelle.

The French military circles became interested in this 2′C n2t locomotive type for their Decauville Light Military Railways in Morocco. A little heavier 14-ton type was designed and an order was placed for Weidknecht to produce these locomotives for the  gauge lines in Morocco.

Weidknecht delivered 10 more in 1913 for Chemins de fer Militaires du Maroc numbered (W1-W5 and 1-5).

Baldwin built locomotives

For the French Government
When the Great War broke out in August 1914 the French lost most of their locomotive building capacity in the Northern France to German-occupied area. Therefore, the French Army demanded fast replacement of the locomotive building capacity for their useful 2′C n2t type which had proved to be a reliable locomotive type for the lightly laid military railways.

Three steam locomotive type drawings were sent to Baldwin Works (finance guaranteed by the French Government) for production of C n2t, 2′C n2t, and light Mallet B′B n4v for  gauge lines. With the usual American liberty, Baldwin Drawing Office produced their "version Americaine" of these locomotive types. The first C n2t (based to Decauville design) came out in November 1914 and the first batch of 2′C n2t in January 1915. Only two more batches were built for the French.

For the British War Office
The British War Office decided to adopt the type as its principal military steam locomotive, and Baldwin started production in 1916, building 495 locomotives between October 1916 and April 1917. All were delivered except for nine which were lost at sea.

Use outside Europe
Some of the class found during war their way to other theatres of war than Europe. Baldwin 45163–45222 from batch No 1001–1104 were renumbered by the British War Office to War Department Light Railways, Middle East No 581–640 and were shipped to Egypt to be used in Sinai and Palestine during the British 1917 offensive against the Turks. After the war most of them remained in Middle East.

Peacetime service

After the war many of these locomotives were sold and went on to work in France, Britain and India. Indian North Western Railway received fifty locomotives, numbered NWR No 1–50, many of which later operated at sugar mills in various parts of the country. British narrow-gauge railways which used them included:

 Welsh Highland Railway
 Glyn Valley Tramway
 Snailbeach District Railways
 Ashover Light Railway

Preservation

Four Baldwin Class 10-12-D locomotives have been preserved in the UK, all of which had been imported from India:

 No. 608, repatriated along with 44657 in 2013, currently at the Ffestiniog Railway
 No. 778, Leighton Buzzard Light Railway
 No. 794, Welsh Highland Heritage Railway
 No. 779 (Works No. 44657 of 1916), repatriated in March 2013 by the Statfold Barn Railway

No. 778 is operational at its home base, No.794 is undergoing contract restoration at the Vale of Rheidol Railway for the WHHR, works No. 45190 (WDLR 608) is currently at the Ffestiniog and Welsh Highland Railways (having been restored in 2018), and works No. 44657 is undergoing restoration at the SBR. 

One other locomotive, 633 (Baldwin 45215 of 1917), is preserved on the Dreamworld Railway in Coomera, Queensland, Australia. This locomotive worked on a sugar mill in Mackay and prior to the opening of Dreamworld in 1981 after purchase was heavily modified, including a tender, Wild-West style chimney, and conversion to oil-firing. It is currently awaiting overhaul.

Three class 10-12-D locomotives were rebuilt as high-power diesel locomotives in France in 1954. One of these was preserved and now resides at Tacot des Lacs.

Models
Bachmann Branchline have produced the Baldwin Class 10-12-D in 009 gauge in 10 liveries with liveries including War department livery, Ashover light railway, Glyn Valley Tramway, Snailbeach District Railway, Southern Railway and Welsh Highland Railway liveries. Minitrains also produce models of the similar Baldwin War Department 2-6-2PTs in 009.

References

 
 

10-12-D
Railway Operating Division locomotives
600 mm gauge railway locomotives
4-6-0T locomotives
Railway locomotives introduced in 1916